Bereket railway station can refer to the following two stations:

Bereket railway station (Turkmenistan), in the city of Bereket, Turkmenistan
Bereket railway station (Turkey), near the village of Bereket, Niğde in Turkey.